Urobotrya is a genus of plants in the family Opiliaceae described as a genus in 1905.

Urobotrya is native to Africa and Southeast Asia.

Species
 Urobotrya congolana (Baill.) Hiepko - W + C Africa
 Urobotrya floresensis Hiepko - Flores
 Urobotrya latisquama (Gagnep.) Hiepko - Guangxi, Yunnan, Laos, Myanmar, Thailand, Vietnam
 Urobotrya longipes (Gagnep.) Hiepko - Vietnam
 Urobotrya parviflora Hiepko - Borneo
 Urobotrya siamensis Hiepko - Indochina
 Urobotrya sparsiflora (Engl.) Hiepko - Central African Rep., West Congo, East Congo, Angola

References

Opiliaceae
Santalales genera